Count To Ten is a 2007 album by Tina Dico.

Track listing

Sacre Coeur is also a Roman Catholic Basilica in Paris, France.

References

2007 albums
Tina Dico albums